Free Fall is a 1999 American-Canadian-German action film directed by Mario Azzopardi, based on a story by Mark Homer, and screenplay by Ken Wheat and Jim Wheat. The film stars Jaclyn Smith, Bruce Boxleitner, Scott Wentworth, Hannes Jaenicke and Hayden Christensen. The film documents an unusual series of crashes that involves sabotaged airliners.

Plot
After Trans Regional Airlines is hit by a series of mysterious aircraft crashes, National Transportation Safety Board safety expert Renee Brennan (Jaclyn Smith) calls for the grounding of the airline's aircraft, despite opposition from the CEO of the airline, Richard Pierce (Chad Everett). Her plans are thwarted by current boyfriend Mark Ettinger (Bruce Boxleitner), a Federal Aviation Administration inspector who repeatedly countermands her orders. At the latest crash scene, Renee receives a call from a "fan" who appreciates her work and asks if she appreciates his. She then realizes that the crashes are the work of a madman.

After Mark is himself killed in a crash, Renee and FBI agent Scott Wallace (Scott Wentworth) track down the saboteur, Michael Ives (Hannes Jaenicke), a former pilot seeking revenge against the airline for labelling a fatal plane crash in Seattle as pilot error and the pilot was his wife, Karen. The pair are themselves caught in a trap the killer set for them at 33,000 feet.

Cast

 Jaclyn Smith as Renee Brennan 
 Bruce Boxleitner as Mark Ettinger 
 Scott Wentworth as Scott Wallace 
 Hannes Jaenicke as Michael Ives 
 Hayden Christensen as Patrick Brennan 
 Nigel Bennett as Donald Caldwell 
 Chad Everett as Richard Pierce 
 Brett Halsey as Chief of Security Tom Mason 
 Tanja Reichert as Stewardess Holly Nesbitt 
 Robyn Stevan as Polly James 

 Philip Craig as Captain Markham 
 Rod Wilson as Captain Meyers 
 Paul Hubbard as Co-Pilot 
 Anne Ross as Stewardess Janet Reardon 
 Lori Hallier as Stewardess Kelly Mason
 Kate Trotter as Widow
 Brett Porter as Hutchings
 Maria Syrgiannis as Karen Ives
 Kirk Dunn as Flight Controller Dawson
 Peter Van Wart as Frank Greene

Production

Free Fall was filmed by Falling Productions Inc on locations in Toronto, Ontario, at Toronto Pearson International Airport’s old Terminal 1 and in Uxbridge, Ontario. The use of stock footage of airliners is evident. The crash scenes including the first crash is edited from Fearless (1993), while scenes from Miracle Landing (1990) are also used.  The primary aircraft flown by "Trans Regional Airlines" is an Airbus A320, although the shots of cockpits and interiors are from other aircraft. Other aircraft that are seen include a Learjet 35, Boeing 737 and Lockheed L-1011 TriStar.

The film was distributed by Fox Family Channel and first released in the US on January 17, 1999, with 1999 releases in  Italy as Freefall - Panico ad alta quota and in Germany as Angst über den Wolken.  The film had its video premiere in Spain in 2000, followed by video releases in France as Crashs en série, Germany as Freefall: Todesflug 1301, Japan, and New Zealand. It had its television premiere in Sweden on February 19, 2007.

Reception
Free Fall was considered a typical "made-for-television" production, and received decidedly mixed reviews. Film reviewer Hal Erickson simply called the film, "Made for cable." Film reviewer Sergio Ortego said Free Fall "deserves no more than 3 out of 10." He further commented: "This film was indeed very poorly made ... a complete flop, with ridiculous special effects, bad acting, terrible one-liner dialogs, and nearly impossible plotlines, or shall I say, plotholes."

References

Notes

Citations

Bibliography

 Oster, Clinton V., C. Kurt Zorn and John S. Strong. Why Airplanes Crash: Aviation Safety in a Changing World. Oxford, UK: Oxford University Press, 1995. .

External links
 
 

1999 films
1999 action films
American action films
American aviation films
Canadian action films
Canadian aviation films
English-language Canadian films
English-language German films
Films directed by Mario Philip Azzopardi
1990s English-language films
1990s American films
1990s Canadian films